The Silesian Autonomy Movement, abbreviated as RAŚ, is a movement officially declaring its support for the autonomy of Silesia as part of a unified Europe. The association was founded in January 1990 by Rudolf Kołodziejczyk and is based in the Polish part of Upper Silesia. RAŚ sees the Silesians as a "separate nation" rather than primarily as Poles, Germans or Czechs.

On 17 October 2009, the Silesian Autonomy Movement signed a cooperation agreement with its German sister organisation, Initiative der Autonomie Schlesiens (IAS), based in Würzburg, and the UK-based Silesian Autonomy Movement.

In 2002, RAŚ became a member of the European Free Alliance.

In 2007, RAŚ activists reestablished football club 1. FC Katowice. Also, since 2007 RAŚ has organized annual "Autonomy Marches" in Poland (pl, szl).

Nationally, the party is affiliated with Civic Coalition. In 2019, the RAŚ signed an agreement with the Civic Coalition for elections to the Sejm and Senate, in which both parties ran on a joint list in Upper Silesia. The two parties continued to cooperate afterwards, and the secretary of RAŚ, Jacek Tomaszewski, is also a member of the Civic Coalition.

Polish parliamentary elections
The movement participated in the 1991 parliamentary elections and received 40,061 votes (0.36%) and two seats, one of its MPs was Kazimierz Świtoń.

In the 2001 parliamentary elections, two candidates of the movement were included on the lists of the Civic Platform (PO).

In the elections of 2005, several candidates from the movement, including its vice president Krzysztof Kluczniok, took part in the list of the Polish People's Party (PSL).

Ideology 
The main representative of the party and its ideology is Jerzy Gorzelik, known for his controversial statements regarding the historical relations between Silesia and Poland. One of his most known statements include "To give Poland Silesia is like giving a monkey a watch, and after eighty years one can see that the monkey broke the watch." (paraphrase of a statement by David Lloyd George from Paris Peace Conference) and "I am a Silesian, not a Pole, and I have not pledged to Poland, so I have not betrayed her and I do not feel obliged to be loyal to this country." Gorzelik describes the party as being "between" nationalism and regionalism, condemning ethnic nationalism in the sense of a "perennial vision of the nation as a community shaped by the forces of history", emphasising party's belief in a "strictly modern and voluntarist nationalism" instead. 

The party cites Józef Kożdoń and his Silesian People's Party, as well as Ewald Latacz and his Union of Upper Silesians, as the main inspirations for the movement. According to Gorzelik, these two parties had risen at the time when Silesians already emphasised their regional identity beyond the division into Poles, Germans and Czechs. The struggle between Poland, Germany and Czechoslovakia for the ownership of the region resulted in indifference amongst the population, with many identifying themselves exclusively as Silesians and being ready to join whichever nation would give Silesia the greatest autonomy. Silesian Autonomy Movement therefore defines contemporary Silesian identity as inherently pluralist, with Gorzelik stating that "The concept adopted by the animators of the Silesian national movement is at odds with the monistic image of culture and identity propagated by integral nationalism. This is because it assumes multiculturalism. A Silesian is part Czech, part Moravian, part German or part Pole, without having to become any of them. Diversity is therefore at the centre of the Silesian national ideology, and its affirmation becomes the essence of Silesianness." As such, the party affirms that Silesian identity is completely compatible with Polish and European identity as well.

According to party's programme, autonomy should not be the exclusive prerogative of Upper Silesia, but a right of all regions, distributed according to the principles of a regional state, citing the territorial system of Spain and its tradition of localism known as Fuero as a model to follow. The party considers decentralisation and workplace democracy necessary steps towards ensuring economic prosperity of Silesia, arguing that the economy must be controlled by the local workers and community. Socially, RAŚ declares that Silesian autonomy is required for the preservation of Silesian language and culture.

Local elections

Polish local elections, 2006

In the 2006 Polish local elections, the movement did not win a single seat in the sejmik of the Silesian Voivodeship, gaining 4.35% of the popular vote. It finished behind the main parties: Civic Platform (PO), Law and Justice (PiS), Democratic Left Alliance (SLD) and Polish People's Party (PSL), but ahead of other parties such as Self-Defense of the Republic of Poland (Samoobrona), which won 3.96%, and the League of Polish Families (LPR), which won 3.46%. In Opole Voivodeship, RAŚ won 1.46% of all ballots.
RAŚ won mandates in a few municipalities and county councils: in Katowice (7.7% of the popular vote), Ruda Śląska (9.39%), Zabrze (5.71%), Tychy (5.1%), Bytom (6.8%), Mysłowice (8.3%) and Gliwice county (7.54%), Bieruń-Lędziny county (10.4%), Tarnowskie Góry county (7.73%), Siemianowice Śląskie (4.94%), Piekary Śląskie (5.06%), Rybnik county (8.1%).

Polish local elections, 2010

In the 2010 Polish local elections, the movement got three seats (for Jerzy Gorzelik, Henryk Mercik, Janusz Wita) in the sejmik of the Silesian Voivodeship, gaining 8.5% of the popular vote. It is double the result of the previous elections (in 2006). It placed RAŚ after the main parties in Poland: Civic Platform (PO), Law and Justice (PiS) and Democratic Left Alliance (SLD), but ahead of other main National parties: Polish People's Party (PSL), Self-Defense of the Republic of Poland (Samoobrona) and the League of Polish Families (LPR).

In the Silesian part of the Silesian Voivodeship RAŚ had the following percentage of votes: Chorzów area - 17,50%, Katowice area - 15.96%, Rybnik area - 14.57%, Gliwice area - 8.70% and Bielsko-Biała area - 1.58% (actually only half of Bielsko-Biała lies within Silesia). Generally, the average result in Silesia within the Silesian Voivodeship (Katowice, Chorzów, Rybnik and Gliwice areas) was nearly 15%.

In districts of the Silesian Voivodeship which lie outside of the historical Silesian region RAŚ had the following support percentage: Sosnowiec area - 1.37% and Częstochowa area - 0.69%. Towns, cities, communes or municipality councils: Gmina Godów - (10 of 15 seats), Gmina Lyski - (8 of 12 seats), Gmina Cisek - 41.26% (4 seats), powiat rybnicki - 25.61% (5 seats), Czerwionka-Leszczyny 20.48% (4 seats), Mysłowice - 9.29% (2 seats), Katowice - 8.86%, Chorzów - 8.69%, Ruda Śląska - 8.18%, powiat wodzisławski - 7.91%, Powiat Opolski - 5.27%, powiat bieruńsko-lędziński - 4.54% and Gmina Gaszowice (1 seat), Gmina Marklowice (1 seat).

Candidates in the towns, cities, communes or municipalities majors: Gmina Godów - 90.3%, Gmina Lyski - 64.67%, Mysłowice - 9.79%, Ruda Śląska - 7.75%, Chorzów - 7.61%, Rybnik - 3.78%. RAŚ in comparison with the other parties did not have a developed election campaign, moreover, RAŚ is not a political party but a social organization.

Silesian Regional Assembly

Polish local elections, 2014

Silesian Regional Assembly

Controversies 
 In 2000 the Polish Office For State Protection warned in its report that RAŚ may be a potential threat to Poland's interests.
 In 2007, reestablishment of the 1. FC Kattowitz soccer club by the RAŚ activists caused controversy. 1. FC Kattowitz was a soccer club established in 1905 by Germans, the club played in the German football league. Following the Silesian Uprisings in 1921 and a subsequent League of Nations plebiscite, part of the region – including Kattowitz – was granted to Poland and the name of the city was changed to Katowice. With the transfer of the city of Katowice to Poland, the name of the club was Polonized in 1922 to 1. Klub Sportowy Katowice. That same year, the membership of the club successfully challenged the change in court and won the right to play as 1. FC Kattowitz. By 1924, the team was part of regional Polish competition and playing as 1. FC Katowice. Katowice faltered in 1929 and was relegated from first division Polish football, descending to play in the regional Silesian league where they became champions in 1932.

In June 1939, the club's activities were suspended by Polish authorities when they were accused of promoting and supporting the interests of Nazi Germany (through the 1930s, club was overtaken by the radical pro-Nazi nationalists from the Jungdeutsche Partei). After the German invasion of Poland which began World War II in September 1939, the team resumed play with German authorities looking to hold up 1. FC Kattowitz as a model side in Upper Silesia for propaganda purposes.

 In 2010, controversy sparked over the controversial photo on the official RAŚ site. The photo itself showed a young man who held a trophy in his hand and diploma in the other while behind him was a commemorative plaque with words in German "Zum gedenken den gefallenen" (In memory of the fallen), above the plaque was the Iron Cross with dates 1939-1945. On the sides of the commemorative plaque were Silesian and modern Germany flags. When the scandal broke, the Silesian Autonomy Movement has been accused by some of being a "Volksdeutsche organization which real goal is to break the Silesia region from Poland and return it to Germany" and also a "German fifth column in Poland". The photo vanished from the RAŚ site as soon as it was acknowledged in the media. Ryszard Czarnecki, a Polish politician who is a Member of the European Parliament for the Lower Silesian and Opole constituency from Law and Justice, stated on his official Europarliament site that: "On the one hand it proves how contumely and effrontery are Silesian separatists, on the other Polish media can play a positive role only if they want to oppose such iniquity, such defamation of the fallen Poles [who died] from the German hands during the II World War. One must want and can place a dam on this pro-German effrontery."

Meanwhile, writing in a party document entitled "The State of the Nation", the Law and Justice (PiS) leader, Jarosław Kaczyński, said “Being a Silesian is a simple way to cut ties [with a Polish identity], and indeed could be a way to camouflage a German identity”. At a later press conference, the former Prime Minister said that anybody who declared their Silesian nationality was in some way “declaring their Germaness”.

 Jerzy Gorzelik, the current leader and representative of the Silesian Autonomy Movement, has claimed numerous times that he is not Polish by nationality but rather "Upper Silesian". He once stated: I'm Silesian, not Polish. My fatherland is Upper Silesia. I did not pledge anything to Poland nor I promised anything to it so it means that I did not betray it. The state called the Republic of Poland, of which I'm a citizen, refused to give me and my friends a right to self-determination and so that's why I do not feel obligated to loyalty towards this country.

In 2010, Gorzelik was elected to the Sejmik of Silesian Voivodeship. Upon taking a councillor's seat in the Sejmik, he swore an oath (as is mandatory for every councilor of each Voivodeship Sejmik), and thus automatically pledged loyalty to the Republic of Poland (before Gorzelik was elected, oaths were always sworn collectively in the Sejmik of the Silesian Voivodeship). The oath reads as follows:

I do solemnly swear to honestly and diligently carry out my duties to the Polish nation, to protect the sovereignty and the interests of the Polish State, to do everything for the prosperity of the Fatherland, for the community of the autonomous government of the Voivodeship and for the good of its citizens, and to abide by the Constitution and other laws of the Republic of Poland.

 Fear of separatism, instead of officially declared autonomy, was flamed up by some publications in "Jaskółka Śląska" - RAŚ's official magazine. Articles were published that openly called for a sovereign, independent Silesian state.

Leadership 

 Paweł Musioł (1991–1995)
 Zenon Wieczorek (1995–1999)
 Krzysztof Kluczniok (1999–2003)
 Jerzy Gorzelik (since 2003)

See also
Union of Upper Silesians
Silesian People's Party
German Minority (political party)
Silesians Together

References

External links
Konrad Pędziwiatr, “Silesian autonomist movement in Poland and one of its activists”, Tischner European University, 2009
Helen Pidd, Upper Silesia flags up its call for autonomy, The Guardian Friday 8 April 2011

1990 establishments in Poland
European Free Alliance
Federalist parties
History of Silesia
Liberal parties in Poland
Political parties established in 1990
Political parties in Poland
Political parties of minorities in Poland
Separatism in Poland
Pro-European political parties in Poland